Kent Walker is an American legal executive who has served as President of Global Affairs and Chief Legal Officer of Alphabet since 2021.

He advises Google's board and management on legal and policy issues, its work with governments around the world, its policies for content on its various services, and its philanthropic efforts. Before joining Google, Walker worked at various technology companies, including eBay, Netscape, AOL, and Airtouch Communications. Walker began his legal career in San Francisco at Howard, Rice, Nemerovski, Canady, Robertson & Falk, now Arnold & Porter, and worked as a litigator specializing in government and public law issues. He then served as an Assistant U.S. Attorney at the United States' Department of Justice.

Walker graduated from Harvard College and Stanford Law School. He currently serves on the Harvard Board of Overseers  and is a member of the Council on Foreign Relations. He was previously on the HeartFlow Board of Directors, and advised the Mercy Corps Social Ventures Fund.

References

External links 
 

Living people
American lawyers
Stanford Law School alumni
Harvard College alumni
Google employees
Assistant United States Attorneys
Year of birth missing (living people)